Andrés Gómez (born 12 August 1962) is a Spanish former field hockey player who competed in the 1984 Summer Olympics and in the 1988 Summer Olympics.

References

External links
 

1962 births
Living people
Spanish male field hockey players
Olympic field hockey players of Spain
Field hockey players at the 1984 Summer Olympics
Field hockey players at the 1988 Summer Olympics